Lars Jonas Holger Gardell (born 2 November 1963) is a Swedish novelist, playwright, screenwriter and comedian. He is the brother of religion scholar Mattias Gardell. He is well known for his books and plays in all of Scandinavia and his books have been translated to around 25 languages.

Early career

Gardell's first novel,  (The Passion Play), was published in 1985. Since then, he has written some ten novels, including  (A Comedian Growing Up), which became a TV series. He has also written several other books, nine plays and two screenplays that were made into movies, including  (Life is a Schlager). His novels are not yet available in English. He wrote and performed himself the song "", which was performed by Bergström in the film.

Later years
In 2006, more than 20 years after his first novel was published, Gardell is one of Sweden's most famous stand-up comedians. Well known to be openly gay, Gardell is married to the Finnish-Swedish-American writer and TV presenter Mark Levengood. He has one child by a female friend. Gardell performed his own play  (Temporary guest in your life) (2007) at the Scala Theater in Stockholm.

In 2013, Gardell was elected "Homo Bi Trans Person of the Year" at the Swedish Gaygalan Awards, notably for the book  (Don't Ever Wipe Tears Without Gloves). His  prize was presented to him by the Swedish Crown Princess Victoria, whom Gardell thanked with the words: "Victoria, you are our Crown Princess, but tonight I think that I'm our little queen" - this went down well with the Crown Princess, whom Gardell knows well. His husband Levengood hosts the immensely popular "Victoria Day" every year at the Swedish island of Öland, when the Swedes celebrate Crown Princess Victoria's birthday on 14 July.

He participated in Melodifestivalen 2018.

Bibliography
 1979 – 
 1985 – 
 1986 – 
 1987 – 
 1988 – 
 1990 – 
 1992 – 
 1993 – 
 1995 – 
 1997 –  Cheek to cheek. 
 1998 – 
 1998 – 
 2001 – 
 2003 – 
 2006 – Jenny
 2009 – 
 2011 – 
 2012 – 
 2013 – 
 2013 –

Singles

References

Article from The Guardian about Swedish writers

1963 births
Living people
People from Danderyd Municipality
20th-century Swedish novelists
Gay comedians
Swedish male comedians
Swedish male screenwriters
LGBT Christians
Swedish LGBT novelists
Swedish LGBT dramatists and playwrights
Swedish LGBT screenwriters
Gay screenwriters
Sommar (radio program) hosts
Gay dramatists and playwrights
Best Screenplay Guldbagge Award winners
Swedish male novelists
Swedish male dramatists and playwrights
21st-century Swedish novelists
Gay novelists
Melodifestivalen contestants of 2018